Xai-Xai is a city in the south of Mozambique.  Until 1975, the city was named João Belo. It is the capital of Gaza Province. As of 2007 it has a population of 116,343.

History

Portuguese rule
Xai-Xai, formerly João Belo, developed in the early 1900s, under Portuguese rule, as a companion port to Lourenço Marques (now Maputo), though its economic significance was never on par with Mozambique's largest city. Before independence from Portugal in 1975, Xai-Xai was known as João Belo, in the Overseas Province of Mozambique. João Belo grew and developed under Portuguese rule as a port, agricultural and industrial centre (rice and cashew were harvested and processed), a provider of services, including a district hospital and banking, and an administrative centre. Tourism was also important with beaches and hotels. In 1970, the city had 63,949 inhabitants.

Post-independence from Portugal
It was hit hard by the 2000 Limpopo floods, with some buildings  under water. However, shortly after the waters receded the town was opened for business again.

Geography
Xai-Xai is located close to the Indian Ocean, on the Limpopo River.

Climate
Xai-Xai has a tropical savanna climate (Köppen climate classification Aw).

Attractions
Xai-Xai is a bustling town with markets, shops, restaurants, bars, petrol stations, banks, and a post office. A few blocks from the central market, there is an open-air furniture factory, located underneath several cashew trees. The beach of Praia do Xai-Xai, approximately 12 km from Xai-Xai, has been a popular tourist attraction since Mozambican tourism, originally under Portuguese administration, was first developed before 1975. A coral reef running parallel to the shore offers good snorkeling and protects the beach from strong waves.
Right on Praia de Xai Xai Beach there is a giant rock pool that forms at medium and low tides that is up to 200 metres long, forming a giant safe pool for families and swimmers.

Demographics

Transport

Xai Xai was served by the  gauge Gaza Railway, which went to the city of Manjacaze and beyond.  It lies on the EN1 road which connects with the roads from the Namaacha and Ressano Garcia borders. It is possible to travel to Xai-Xai by charter flight from Maputo.

In 2017, the People's Republic of China pledged $60 million to build an airport in Xai-Xai.

That airport was inaugurated in 2021 and is served by one airline, LAM Mozambique.

Gallery

Sister city 
  Cascais, Portugal

See also 
 List of reduplicated place names

References 

Limpopo River
Populated places in Gaza Province
Provincial capitals in Mozambique